Paul Cazeneuve (10 January 1852, Lyon - 30 March 1934 Paris) was a French politician. He belonged to the Radical Party. He was a member of the Chamber of Deputies from 1902 to 1909 and a Senator from 1909 to 1920.

References

1852 births
1934 deaths
Politicians from Lyon
Radical Party (France) politicians
Members of the 8th Chamber of Deputies of the French Third Republic
Members of the 9th Chamber of Deputies of the French Third Republic
French Senators of the Third Republic
Senators of Rhône (department)